Hartlepool is a seaside and port town in County Durham, England. It is governed by a unitary authority borough named after the town which also governs the civil parishes of Greatham, Hart, Dalton Piercy and Elwick. The borough is part of the devolved Tees Valley area. With an estimated population of 90,123, it is the second-largest settlement (after Darlington) in County Durham.

The old town was founded in the 7th century, around the monastery of Hartlepool Abbey on a headland. As the village grew into a town in the Middle Ages, its harbour served as the County Palatine of Durham's official port. The new town of West Hartlepool was created in 1835 after a new port was built and railway links from the South Durham coal fields (to the north) and from Stockton-on-Tees (to the south) were created. The two towns merged and became known as the Hartlepools before dropping the "s".

Industrialisation in northern England and the start of a shipbuilding industry in the later part of the 19th century meant it was a target for the Imperial German Navy at the beginning of the First World War. A bombardment of 1,150 shells on 16 December 1914 resulted in the death of 117 people in the town. A severe decline in heavy industries and shipbuilding following the Second World War caused periods of high unemployment until the 1990s when major investment projects and the redevelopment of the docks area into a marina saw a rise in the town's prospects.

Toponymy

The place name derives from Old English heort ("hart"), referring to stags seen, and pōl (pool), a pool of drinking water which they were known to use. Records of the place-name from early sources confirm this:
 649: Heretu, or Hereteu.
 1017: Herterpol, or Hertelpolle.
 1182: Hierdepol.
The 8th-century Northumbrian chronicler Bede referred to the spot on which today's town is sited upon as "the place where deer come to drink", and in this period the Headland was named by the Angles as Heruteu (Stag Island). At the beginning of the 11th century the name had evolved into Herterpol, and after the Norman Conquest the name of the village sited there evolved in Middle English as: Hart-le-pool ("The Pool of the Stags"). Archaeological evidence has been found below the current high tide mark that indicates that an ancient post-glacial forest by the sea existed in the area during this period.

History

Town on the heugh

Following the end of Roman rule in its province of Britannia in the early 5th century, the northeastern coast was raided by the Angles from across the North Sea in Scandinavia. They subsequently began crossing the North Sea and settled in the area, creating the Kingdom of Northumbria in sub-Roman Britain. Hartlepool began as an Anglian settlement, and a town developed in the 7th century sited around Hartlepool Abbey, which had been founded in 640 by the Irish Christian priest Saint Aidan upon a headland overlooking a natural harbour and the North Sea. The monastery became powerful under St Hilda, who served as its abbess from 649 to 657. The Abbey fell into decline with the loss of Northumbrian power in the early 8th century, and it was probably destroyed during a sea raid by Vikings on Hartlepool in the 9th century. In March 2000, the archaeological investigation television programme Time Team located the foundations of the lost monastery in the grounds of St Hilda's Church.

Hartness

During the Norman Conquest, the De Brus family gained over-lordship of the land surrounding Hartlepool. William the Conqueror subsequently ordered the construction of Durham Castle, and the villages under their rule were mentioned in records in 1153 when Robert de Brus, 1st Lord of Annandale became Lord of Hartness. The town's first charter was received before 1185, for which it gained its first mayor, an annual two-week fair and a weekly market.

By the Middle Ages Hartlepool was growing into an important (though still small) market town, one of the reasons for its escalating wealth being that its harbour was serving now as the official port of the County Palatine of Durham. The main industry of the town at this time was fishing, and Hartlepool in this period established itself as one of the primary ports upon England's Eastern coast.

In 1306, Robert the Bruce was crowned King of Scotland, and became the last Lord of Hartness. Angered, King Edward I confiscated the title to Hartlepool, and began to improve the town's military defences in expectation of war. In 1315, before they were completed, a Scottish army under Sir James Douglas attacked, captured and looted the town.

In the late 15th century a pier was constructed to assist in the harbour's workload.

Garrison
Hartlepool was once again militarily occupied by a Scottish incursion, this time in alliance with the Parliamentary Army during the English Civil War, which after 18 months was relieved by an English Parliamentarian garrison.

In 1795 Hartlepool artillery emplacements and defences were constructed in the town as a defensive measure against the threat of French attack from seaborne Napoleonic forces. During the Crimean War two coastal batteries were constructed close together in the town to guard against the threat of seaborne attacks from the Imperial Russian Navy, they were entitled the Lighthouse Battery (1855) and the Heugh Battery (1859).

Hartlepool in the 18th century became known as a town with medicinal springs, particularly the Chalybeate Spa near the Westgate. The poet Thomas Gray visited the town in July 1765 to "take the waters", and wrote to his friend William Mason:

A few weeks later, he wrote in greater detail to James Brown:

Town by the strand

 
By the early nineteenth century, Hartlepool was still a small town of around 900 people, with a declining port. In 1823 the council and Board of Trade decided that the town needed new industry, so the decision was made to propose a new railway to make Hartlepool a coal port, shipping out minerals from the Durham coalfield. It was in this endeavour that Isambard Kingdom Brunel visited the town in December 1831, and wrote: "A curiously isolated old fishing town – a remarkably fine race of men. Went to the top of the church tower for a view."

But the plan was faced by local competition from new docks.  to the north, the Marquis of Londonderry had approved the creation of the new Seaham Harbour (opened 31 July 1831), while to the south the Clarence Railway connected Stockton-on-Tees and Billingham to a new port at Port Clarence (opened 1833). Further south again, in 1831 the Stockton and Darlington Railway had extended into the new port of Middlesbrough.

The council agreed the formation of the Hartlepool Dock and Railway Company (HD&RCo) to extend the existing port by developing new docks, and link to both local collieries and the developing railway network in the south. In 1833, it was agreed that Christopher Tennant of Yarm establish the HD&RCo, having previously opened the Clarence Railway (CR). Tennant's plan was that the HD&RCo would fund the creation of a new railway, the Stockton and Hartlepool Railway, which would take over the loss-making CR and extended it north to the new dock, thereby linking to the Durham coalfield.

After Tennant died, in 1839, the running of the HD&RCo was taken over by Stockton-on-Tees solicitor, Ralph Ward Jackson. But Jackson became frustrated at the planning restrictions placed on the old Hartlepool dock and surrounding area for access, so bought land which was mainly sand dunes to the south-west, and established West Hartlepool. Because Jackson was so successful at shipping coal from West Hartlepool through his West Hartlepool Dock and Railway Company and, as technology developed, ships grew in size and scale, the new town would eventually dwarf the old town.

The  West Hartlepool Harbour and Dock opened on 1 June 1847. On 1 June 1852 the  Jackson Dock opened on the same day that a railway opened connecting West Hartlepool to Leeds, Manchester and Liverpool. This allowed the shipping of coal and wool products eastwards, and the shipping of fresh fish and raw fleeces westwards, enabling another growth spurt in the town. This in turn resulted in the opening of the Swainson Dock on 3 June 1856, named after Ward Jackson's father-in-law. In 1878 the William Gray & Co shipyard in West Hartlepool achieved the distinction of launching the largest tonnage of any shipyard in the world, a feat to be repeated on a number of occasions. By 1881, old Hartlepool's population had grown from 993 to 12,361, but West Hartlepool had a population of 28,000.

Ward Jackson helped to plan the layout of West Hartlepool and was responsible for the first public buildings. He was also involved in the education and the welfare of the inhabitants. In the end, he was a victim of his own ambition to promote the town: accusations of shady financial dealings, and years of legal battles, left him in near-poverty. He spent the last few years of his life in London, far away from the town he had created.

World Wars
First

The area became heavily industrialised with an ironworks (established 1838) and shipyards in the docks (established in the 1870s). By 1913, no fewer than 43 ship-owning companies were located in the town, with responsibility for 236 ships. This made it a key target for Germany in the First World War. One of the first German offensives against Britain was a raid and bombardment on the by Imperial German Navy on the morning of 16 December 1914, 

Hartlepool was hit with a total of 1150 shells, killing 117 people. Two coastal defence batteries at Hartlepool returned fire, launching 143 shells, and damaging three German ships: SMS Seydlitz, SMS Moltke and SMS Blücher. The Hartlepool engagement lasted roughly 50 minutes, and the coastal artillery defence was supported by the Royal Navy in the form of four destroyers, two light cruisers and a submarine, none of which had any significant impact on the German attackers.

Private Theophilus Jones of the 18th Battalion Durham Light Infantry, who fell as a result of this bombardment, is sometimes described as the first military casualty on British soil by enemy fire. This event (the death of the first soldiers on British soil) is commemorated by the 1921 Redheugh Gardens War Memorial together with a plaque unveiled on the same day (seven years and one day after the East Coast Raid) at the spot on the Headland (the memorial by Philip Bennison illustrates four soldiers on one of four cartouches and the plaque, donated by a member of the public, refers to the 'first soldier' but gives no name). A living history group, the Hartlepool Military Heritage Memorial Society, portray men of that unit for educational and memorial purposes.

Hartlepudlians voluntarily subscribed more money per head to the war effort than any other town in Britain.

Between

On 4 January 1922, a fire starting in a timber yard left 80 people homeless and caused over £1,000,000 pounds of damage. Hartlepool suffered badly in the Great Depression of the 1930s and endured high unemployment.

Second

Unemployment decreased during the Second World War, with shipbuilding and steel-making industries enjoying a renaissance. Most of its output for the war effort were "Empire Ships". German bombers raided the town 43 times, though, compared to the previous war, civilian losses were lighter with 26 deaths recorded by Hartlepool Municipal Borough and 49 by West Hartlepool Borough. During the Second World War, RAF Greatham (also known as RAF West Hartlepool) was located on the South British Steel Corporation Works.

The merge

In 1891 the two towns had a combined population of 64,000. By 1900 the two Hartlepools were, together, one of the three busiest ports in England.

The modern town represents a joining of "Old Hartlepool", locally known as the "Headland", and West Hartlepool. As already mentioned, what was West Hartlepool became the larger town and both were formally unified in 1967. Today the term "West Hartlepool" is rarely heard outside the context of sport, but one of the town's Rugby Union teams still retains the name.

The name of the town's professional football club reflected both boroughs; when it was formed in 1908, following the success of West Hartlepool in winning the FA Amateur Cup in 1905, it was called "Hartlepools United" in the hope of attracting support from both towns. When the boroughs combined in 1967 the club renamed itself "Hartlepool" before re-renaming itself Hartlepool United in the 1970s. Many fans of the club still refer to the team as "Pools"

Fall out

After the war, industry went into a severe decline. Blanchland, the last ship to be constructed in Hartlepool, left the slips in 1961. In 1967, Betty James wrote how "if I had the luck to live anywhere in the North East [of England]...I would live near Hartlepool. If I had the luck". There was a boost to the retail sector in 1970 when Middleton Grange Shopping Centre was opened by Princess Anne, with over 130 new shops including Marks & Spencer and Woolworths.

Before the shopping centre was opened, the old town centre was located around Lynn Street, but most of the shops and the market had moved to a new shopping centre by 1974. Most of Lynn Street had by then been demolished to make way for a new housing estate. Only the north end of the street remains, now called Lynn Street North. This is where the Hartlepool Borough Council depot was based (alongside the Focus DIY store) until it moved to the marina in August 2006.

In 1977, the British Steel Corporation announced the closure of its Hartlepool steelworks with the loss of 1500 jobs. In the 1980s the area was afflicted with extremely high levels of unemployment, at its peak consisting of 30 per cent of the town's working-age population, the highest in the United Kingdom. 630 jobs at British Steel were lost in 1983, and a total of 10,000 jobs were lost from the town in the economic de-industrialization of England's former Northern manufacturing heartlands. Between 1983 and 1999 the town lacked a cinema and areas of it became afflicted with the societal hallmarks of endemic economic poverty: urban decay, high crime levels, drug and alcohol dependency being prevalent.

Rise and the future
Docks near the centre were redeveloped and reopened, by Queen Elizabeth II, in 1993 as a marina with the accompanying National Museum of the Royal Navy opened in 1994, then known as the Hartlepool Historic Quay.

A development corporation is under consultation until August 2022 to organise  projects, with the town's fund given to the town and other funds. Plans would be (if the corporation is formed) focused on the railway station, waterfront (including the Royal Navy Museum and a new leisure centre) and Church Street. Northern School of Art also has funds for a TV and film studios.

Governance

Hartlepool was traditionally administered as a part of the County Palatine of Durham until 1850 when Old Hartlepool i.e. the Headland was incorporated as a municipal borough with its headquarters, Hartlepool Borough Hall, completed in 1866.

In 1887 West Hartlepool was also incorporated as a municipal borough, with its own headquarters, West Hartlepool Town Hall, completed in 1897. In 1902 West Hartlepool was incorporated as a county borough in its own right, remaining non-administratively in County Durham. The old Hartlepool Borough Council amalgamated with West Hartlepool Borough Council to form a combined authority in 1967.

In 1974, the combined council was merged into Cleveland, which appointed its own Lord Lieutenant. The 1996 Banham Review, disbanded Cleveland county and gave unitary authority status to its four districts, Hartlepool borough and part of Stockton-on-Tees borough became a part of non-administrative County Durham under the Lieutenancies Act 1997. Since the 2010s, Hartlepool is also part of the Tees Valley region, a mayor for the region was elected in 2016. Although the former districts and boroughs of Durham now form the unitary authority of County Durham. This means that County Durham now has four unitary authorities.

Council

After boundary changes introduced in 2019, Hartlepool is now divided into 12 electoral wards, each of which elects three councillors who make up the 36 councillors of the Borough Council.

Members of Parliament

Hartlepool is represented in the House of Commons by one Member of Parliament. The current MP for the Hartlepool constituency is Jill Mortimer of the Conservative Party. She was elected at the 2021 Hartlepool by-election with 51.9% of the vote.

Members of parliament for Hartlepool since 1945 have been:

Mandelson, the MP between 1992 and 2004, resigned to take up a role in the European Commission. On 13 October 2008 he was created Baron Mandelson of Foy and Hartlepool following his appointment as Secretary of State for Business, Enterprise and Regulatory Reform in the British Government.

Emergency services

Hartlepool falls within the jurisdiction of Cleveland Fire Brigade and Cleveland Police. Before 1974, it was under the jurisdiction of the Durham Constabulary and Durham Fire Brigade. Hartlepool  has two fire stations: a full-time station at Stranton and a retained station on the Headland.

Geography

Distance to other places

Nearby smaller towns include: Seaham; Sedgefield; Billingham and Peterlee. Beyond the far side of the Tees Bay, on the other side of the River Tees, the distant monument on Eston Nab can be seen on clear days.

Economy
Hartlepool's economy has historically been linked with the maritime industry, something which is still at the heart of local business. Hartlepool Dock is owned and run by PD Ports. Engineering related jobs employ around 1700 people. Tata Steel Europe employ around 350 people in the manufacture of steel tubes, predominantly for the oil industry. South of the town on the banks of the Tees, Able UK operates the Teesside Environmental Reclamation and Recycling Centre (TERRC), a large scale marine recycling facility and dry dock. Adjacent to the east of TERRC is the Hartlepool nuclear power station, an advanced gas-cooled reactor (AGR) type nuclear power plant opened in the 1980s. It is the single largest employer in the town, employing 1 per cent of the town's working age people.

The chemicals industry is important to the local economy. Companies include Huntsman Corporation, who produce titanium dioxide for use in paints, Omya, Baker Hughes and Frutarom.

Tourism was worth £48 million to the town in 2009; this figure excludes the impact of the Tall Ships 2010. Hartlepool's historic links to the maritime industry are centred on the Maritime Experience, and the supporting exhibits PS Wingfield Castle and HMS Trincomalee.

Camerons Brewery was founded in 1852 and currently employs around 145 people. It is one of the largest breweries in the UK. Following a series of take-overs, it came under the control of the Castle Eden Brewery in 2001 who merged the two breweries, closing down the Castle Eden plant. It brews a range of cask and bottled beers, including Strongarm, a 4% abv bitter. The brewery is heavily engaged in contract brewing such beers as Kronenbourg 1664, John Smith's and Foster's.

Orchid Drinks of Hartlepool were formed in 1992 after a management buy out of the soft drinks arm of Camerons. They manufactured Purdey's and Amé. Following a £67 million takeover by Britvic, the site was closed down in 2009.

Middleton Grange Shopping Centre is the main shopping location. 2800 people are employed in retail. The ten major retail companies in the town are Tesco, Morrisons, Asda, Next, Argos, Marks & Spencer, Aldi, Boots and Matalan. Aside from the local sports clubs, other local entertainment venues include a VUE Cinema and Mecca Bingo.

Companies that have moved operations to the town for the offshore wind farm include Siemens and Van Oord.

Culture and community

Festivals and Fairs 
Since November 2014 the Headland has hosted the annual Wintertide Festival, which is a weekend long event that starts with a community parade on the Friday and culminating in a finale performance and fireworks display on the Sunday.

Tall Ships' Races
On 28 June 2006 Hartlepool celebrated after winning its bid to host The Tall Ships' Races. The town welcomed up to 125 tall ships in 2010, after being chosen by race organiser Sail Training International to be the finishing point for the race. Hartlepool greeted the ships, which sailed from Kristiansand in Norway on the second and final leg of the race.

Museums, art galleries and libraries 
Hartlepool Art Gallery is located in Church Square within Christ Church, a restored Victorian church, built in 1854 and designed by the architect Edward Buckton Lamb (1806–1869). The gallery's temporary exhibitions change frequently and feature works from local artists and the permanent Fine Art Collection, which was established by Sir William Gray. The gallery also houses the Hartlepool tourist information centre.

The Heugh Battery Museum is located on the Headland. It was one of three batteries erected to protect Hartlepool's port in 1860. The battery was closed in 1956 and is now in the care of the Heugh Gun Battery Trust and home to an artillery collection.

Hartlepool is home to a National Museum of the Royal Navy (The other in Portsmouth). Previously known simply as The Historic Quay, the museum is a re-creation of an 18th-century seaport and host to Hartlepool's Maritime Experience. The centre-piece of the exhibition is a sailing frigate, HMS Trincomalee.

Willows was the Hartlepool mansion of the influential Sir William Gray of William Gray & Company and he gifted it to the town in 1920, after which it was converted to be the town's first museum and art gallery. Fondly known locally as "The Gray" it was closed as a museum in 1994 and now houses the local authority's culture department.

There are six libraries in Hartlepool, the primary one being the Community Hub Central Library. Others are Throston Grange Library, Community Hub North Library, Seaton Carew Library, Owton Manor Library and Headland Branch Library.

Transport

Road
Hartlepool is served by two primary routes which are the A179 road and the A689 road, both linking the town to the A19 road. The A179 road is the main road to the north-west which leads to the A19 road, Durham, Sunderland and Tyneside. The A689 road is the main road to the south-west towards the A19 & Billingham, Stockton, Middlesbrough and York. The A178 road leads south to Seaton Carew, Graythorp, Seal Sands, Port Clarence and Middlesbrough via the Transporter bridge. The A1086 road leads north to Crimdon, Blackhall, Horden, Peterlee and Easington.

Rail

The service marks the first time since the 1980s that Hartlepool has had a direct rail link with London which takes around three and a half hours.

Bus
Local bus services are provided around the town mainly by Stagecoach North East. The operator has the service 36 from Hartlepool to Billingham, Stockton and Middlesbrough, as well as the faster service 1 to Middlesbrough via Seaton Carew and Port Clarence.

Other services are provided by Arriva North East and Go North East from Hartlepool to Peterlee, Durham, Seaham, Hetton-le-Hole, Houghton-le-Spring and Sunderland.

Sea

Hartlepool has been a major seaport virtually since it was founded, and has a long fishing heritage. During the industrial revolution massive new docks were created on the southern side of the channel running below the Headland, which gave rise to the town of West Hartlepool.

Now owned by PD Ports, the docks are still in use today and still capable of handling large vessels. However, a large portion of the former dockland was converted into a marina capable of berthing 500 vessels. Hartlepool Marina is home to a wide variety of pleasure and working craft, with passage to and from the sea through a lock.

Hartlepool also has a permanent RNLI lifeboat station.

Education

Secondary
Hartlepool has five secondary schools:
Dyke House Sports and Technology College
English Martyrs School and Sixth Form College
High Tunstall College of Science
Manor Community Academy
St Hild's Church of England School
The town had planned to receive funding from central government to improve school buildings and facilities as a part of the Building Schools for the Future programme, but this was cancelled because of government spending cuts.

College
Hartlepool College of Further Education is an educational establishment located in the centre of the town, and existed in various forms for over a century. Its former 1960s campus was replaced by a £52million custom-designed building, it was approved in principle in July 2008, opened in September 2011.

Hartlepool also has Hartlepool Sixth Form College. It was a former grammar and comprehensive school, the college provides a number of AS and A2 Level student courses. The English Martyrs School and Sixth Form College also offers AS, A2 and other BTEC qualification to 16- to 18-year-olds from Hartlepool and beyond.

A campus of The Northern School of Art is a specialist art and design college and higher education, located adjacent to the art gallery on Church Square. The college has a further site in Middlesbrough that facilitates further education.

Territorial Army
Situated in the New Armoury Centre, Easington Road are the following units.

Royal Marines Reserve
90 (North Riding) Signal Squadron

Sport

Football

Hartlepool United is the town's professional football club and they play at Victoria Park. The club's most notable moment was in 2005 when, with 8 minutes left in the 2005 Football League One play-off final, the team conceded a penalty, allowing Sheffield Wednesday to equalise and eventually beat Hartlepool to a place in the Championship. The club currently play in EFL League Two.

Supporters of the club bear the nickname of Monkey Hangers. This is based upon a legend that during the Napoleonic wars a monkey, which had been a ship's mascot, was taken for a French spy and hanged. Hartlepool has also produced football presenter Jeff Stelling, who has a renowned partnership with Chris Kamara who was born in nearby Middlesbrough. Jeff Stelling is a keen supporter of Hartlepool United Football Club and often refers to them when presenting Sky Sports News. It is also the birthplace and childhood home of Pete Donaldson, one of the co-hosts of the Football Ramble podcast as well as co-host of the Abroad in Japan podcast, and a prominent radio DJ.

Rugby union

Hartlepool is something of an anomaly in England having historically maintained a disproportionate number of clubs in a town of only c.90,000 inhabitants.  These include(d) West Hartlepool, Hartlepool Rovers, Hartlepool Athletic RFC, Hartlepool Boys Brigade Old Boys RFC (BBOB), Seaton Carew RUFC (formerly Hartlepool Grammar School Old Boys), West Hartlepool Technical Day School Old Boys RUFC (TDSOB or Tech) and Hartlepool Old Boys' RFC (Hartlepool). Starting in 1904 clubs within  of the headland were eligible to compete for the Pyman Cup which has been contested regularly since and that the Hartlepool & District Union continue to organise.

Perhaps the best known club outside the town is West Hartlepool R.F.C. who in 1992 achieved promotion to what is now the Premiership competing in 1992–93, 1994–95, 1995–96 and 1996–97 seasons. This success came at a price as soon after West was then hit by bankruptcy and controversially sold their Brierton Lane stadium and pitch to former sponsor Yuills Homes. There then followed a succession of relegations before the club stabilised in the Durham/Northumberland leagues. West and Rovers continue to play one another in a popular Boxing Day fixture which traditionally draws a large crowd.

Hartlepool Rovers, formed in 1879, who played at the Old Friarage in the Headland area of Hartlepool before moving to West View Road. In the 1890s Rovers supplied numerous county, divisional and international players. The club itself hosted many high-profile matches including the inaugural Barbarians F.C. match in 1890, the New Zealand Maoris in 1888 and the legendary All Blacks who played against a combined Hartlepool Club team in 1905. In the 1911–12 season, Hartlepool Rovers broke the world record for the number of points scored in a season racking up 860 points including 122 tries, 87 conversions, five penalties and eleven drop goals.

Although they ceased competing in the RFU leagues in 2008–09, West Hartlepool TDSOB (Tech) continues to support town and County rugby with several of the town's other clubs having played at Grayfields when their own pitches were unavailable. Grayfields has also hosted a number of Durham County cup finals as well as County Under 16, Under 18 and Under 20 age group games.

Olympics

Boxing
At the 2012 Summer Olympics, 21-year-old Savannah Marshall, who attended English Martyrs School and Sixth Form College in the town of Hartlepool, competed in the Women's boxing tournament of the 2012 Olympic Games. She was defeated 12–6 by Marina Volnova of Kazakhstan in her opening, quarter-final bout. Savannah Marshall is now a professional boxer, currently unbeaten as a pro and on 31 October 2020 in her 9th professional fight Marshall became the WBO female middleweight champion with a TKO victory over opponent Hannah Rankin at Wembley Arena.

Swimming
In August 2012 Jemma Lowe, a British record holder who attended High Tunstall College of Science in the town of Hartlepool, competed in the 2012 Olympic Games. She finished sixth in the 200-metre butterfly final with a time of 58.06 seconds. She was also a member of the eighth-place British team in the 400m Medley relay.

Monkeys

Hartlepool is known for allegedly executing a monkey during the Napoleonic Wars. According to legend, fishermen from Hartlepool watched a French warship founder off the coast, and the only survivor was a monkey, which was dressed in French military uniform, presumably to amuse the officers on the ship. The fishermen assumed that this must be what Frenchmen looked like and, after a brief trial, summarily executed the monkey.

Historians have pointed to the prior existence of a Scottish folk song called "And the Boddamers hung the Monkey-O". It describes how a monkey survived a shipwreck off the village of Boddam near Peterhead in Aberdeenshire. Because the villagers could only claim salvage rights if there were no survivors from the wreck, they allegedly hanged the monkey. There is also an English folk song detailing the later event called, appropriately enough, "The Hartlepool Monkey". In the English version the monkey is hanged as a French spy.

"Monkey hanger" and Chimp Choker are common terms of (semi-friendly) abuse aimed at "Poolies", often from footballing rivals Darlington. The mascot of Hartlepool United F.C. is H'Angus the monkey. The man in the monkey costume, Stuart Drummond, stood for the post of mayor in 2002 as H'angus the monkey, and campaigned on a platform which included free bananas for schoolchildren. To widespread surprise, he won, becoming the first directly elected mayor of Hartlepool, winning 7,400 votes with a 52% share of the vote and a turnout of 30%. He was re-elected by a landslide in 2005, winning 16,912 on a turnout of 51% – 10,000 votes more than his nearest rival, the Labour Party candidate.

The monkey legend is also linked with two of the town's sports clubs, Hartlepool Rovers RFC, which uses the hanging monkey as the club logo. Hartlepool (Old Boys) RFC use a hanging monkey kicking a rugby ball as their tie crest.

Notable residents

 Michael Brown, former Premier League footballer
 Edward Clarke, artist 
 Brian Clough, football manager who lived in the Fens estate in town while manager of Hartlepools United
 John Darwin, convicted fraudster who faked his own death
 Pete Donaldson, London radio DJ and podcast host
 Janick Gers, guitarist from British heavy metal band Iron Maiden
 Courtney Hadwin, singer
 Jack Howe, former England international footballer
 Liam Howe, music producer and songwriter for several artists and member of the band Sneaker Pimps
 Saxon Huxley, WWE NXT UK wrestler
 Andy Linighan, former Arsenal footballer who scored the winning goal in the 1993 FA Cup Final
 Savannah Marshall, professional boxer
 Guy Pearce, film actor who lived in the town when he was younger as his mother was from the town
 Narbi Price, artist
 Jack Rowell, coached the England international rugby team and led them to the semi-final of the 1995 Rugby World Cup
 Wayne Sleep, dancer and actor who spent his childhood in the town.
 Reg Smythe, cartoonist who created Andy Capp
 Jeremy Spencer, guitarist who was in the original Fleetwood Mac line-up
 Jeff Stelling, TV presenter, famous for hosting Gillette Soccer Saturday

Local media
 Hartlepool Life - local free newspaper
 Hartlepool Mail – local newspaper
 BBC Radio Tees – BBC local radio station
 Radio Hartlepool – Community radio station serving the town
 Hartlepool Post – on-line publication

Town twinning
Hartlepool is twinned with:
  Sète, France
  Hückelhoven, Germany (since 1973)
  Muskegon, Michigan
  Sliema, Malta
  Novovolynsk, Ukraine

Climate
Hartlepool has an oceanic climate typical of Great Britain. The Köppen Climate Classification subtype for this climate is "Cfb"(Marine West Coast Climate).

References

External links

 Official Website of the Borough of Hartlepool
 Tide times for Hartlepool from the BBC, Easytide and Tidetimes.

 
Towns in County Durham
Places in the Tees Valley
Populated coastal places in County Durham
Populated places established in the 7th century
Unparished areas in County Durham
Borough of Hartlepool